The 1886–87 season was Morton Football Club's tenth season in which they competed at a national level. The club competed in the 14th Scottish Cup.

Fixtures and results

Scottish Cup

References

External links
Greenock Morton FC official site
1886-87 Scottish Cup
Scottish Football Historical Archive
Google Glasgow Herald Archives

Greenock Morton F.C. seasons
Morton